Wejherowo railway station is a railway station serving the town of Wejherowo, in the Pomeranian Voivodeship, Poland. The station opened in 1870 and is located on the Gdańsk–Stargard railway. The train services are operated by PKP, Przewozy Regionalne and SKM Tricity.

At the time of building, the station was named after the German name of the town, Neustadt (Westpreußen), which was reused later under Nazi occupation. The station used to be a junction for the now closed Wejherowo–Garczegorze railway.

Train services
The station is served by the following services:

 Intercity services (IC) Łódź Fabryczna — Warszawa — Gdańsk Glowny — Kołobrzeg
Intercity services (IC) Szczecin - Koszalin - Słupsk - Gdynia - Gdańsk
Intercity services (IC) Szczecin - Koszalin - Słupsk - Gdynia - Gdańsk - Elbląg/Iława - Olsztyn
Intercity services (IC) Szczecin - Koszalin - Słupsk - Gdynia - Gdańsk - Elbląg - Olsztyn - Białystok
Intercity services (TLK) Kołobrzeg — Gdynia Główna — Warszawa Wschodnia — Kraków Główny
Regional services (R) Tczew — Słupsk  
Regional services (R) Malbork — Słupsk  
Regional services (R) Elbląg — Słupsk  
Regional services (R) Słupsk — Bydgoszcz Główna 
Regional services (R) Luzino — Gdynia Główna
Regional services (R) Słupsk — Gdynia Główna
Szybka Kolej Miejska services (SKM) (Lebork -) Wejherowo - Reda - Rumia - Gdynia - Sopot - Gdansk

References 

 This article is based upon a translation of the Polish language version as of October 2016.

External links

Railway stations in Poland opened in 1870
Railway stations served by Szybka Kolej Miejska (Tricity)
Railway stations in Pomeranian Voivodeship
Wejherowo County